Hannes Maasel (born 10 October 1951) is an Estonian politician. Since 1999 he has served as the governor of Hiiu County.

References

External links
CV 

Living people
1951 births
Estonian Reform Party politicians
People from Hiiumaa Parish
20th-century Estonian politicians
21st-century Estonian politicians
Tallinn University alumni